Sándor Erdély (1 August 1839 - 15 May 1922) was a Hungarian politician and jurist, who served as Minister of Justice between 1895 and 1899.

References
 Magyar Életrajzi Lexikon

1839 births
1922 deaths
Justice ministers of Hungary